Prior to March 2018, the State Administration for Industry and Commerce (SAIC) was the authority in the People's Republic of China responsible for advancing legislation concerning the administration of industry and commerce in the People's Republic. On a local level, the organizations responsibilities roughly mimicked those of the secretaries of individual states in the United States as a registration and licensing authority. The last minister was Zhang Mao.

As part of China's 2018 government administration overhaul, the SAIC was merged into the newly created State Administration for Market Regulation.

Administration 
The agency was organized into the following divisions:

General Office
Department of Law
Antimonopoly and Anti-unfair Competition Enforcement Bureau
Direct Selling Regulation Bureau
Consumer Protection Bureau
Department of Market Regulation
Regulation Department for Market Circulation of Food
Enterprise Registration Bureau
Bureau for Registration of Foreign-Invested Enterprises
Department of Advertising Regulation
Department for Regulation of the Private Economy
Department of Personnel
Trademark Office
Trademark Appeal Board

Location 
The head office of the agency is based in 8 Sanlihe Donglu, Xichengqu, Beijing, 100820, China. Locally, SAIC has offices on each regional and municipal level which oversee and regulate the businesses in their jurisdiction.

See also 
 List of company registers

References

External links 
 State Administration for Industry and Commerce Official Website 

Government agencies of China
1953 establishments in China
Government agencies established in 1953
State Council of the People's Republic of China
Organizations based in Beijing